The helmeted hornbill (Rhinoplax vigil) is a very large bird in the hornbill family. It is found on the Malay Peninsula, Sumatra, Borneo, Thailand and Myanmar. The casque (helmetlike structure on the head) accounts for some 11% of its 3 kg weight. Unlike any other hornbill, the casque is almost solid, and is used in head-to-head combat among males. It is a belief among the Punan Bah that a large helmeted hornbill guards the river between life and death.

Description 

It has mostly blackish plumage, except that the belly and legs are white and the tail is white with a black band near the tip of each feather. The tail is long and the two central tail feathers are much longer than the others, giving the bird a total length greater than that of any other hornbill species. Although sometimes considered the largest Asian hornbill, their body weight appears to be similar to that of the great hornbill (and considerably less than the African ground hornbills).

This species has a bare, wrinkled throat patch, pale blue to greenish in females and red in males. The casque goes from the base of the bill halfway to the tip, where it ends abruptly. It and the bill are yellow; the red secretion of the preen gland covers the sides and top of the casque and the base of the bill, but often leaves the front end of the casque and the distal half of the bill yellow. Unlike other hornbills, the helmeted hornbill's casque is solid, and the skull including the casque and bill may constitute 10 percent of the bird's weight.

Call 
The call is a series of loud, intermittent barbet-like hoots, sometimes double-toned and over two dozen in number, which gradually accelerates to culminate in a cackle reminiscent of laughter.

Habits 

Helmeted hornbills mostly eat the fruit of strangler figs. The birds breed once a year, producing a single chick. Mother and chick live inside a sealed tree cavity for the first five months of the chick's life. Males fight over territory on the wing, ramming each other with their casques. Such encounters are called aerial jousting. Females accompany males during an approach in an aerial joust but veer off in opposite directions during the collision.

Status 
After ongoing hunting pressure and habitat loss, the helmeted hornbill was uplisted from near threatened to critically endangered on the IUCN Red List of Threatened Species in 2015. It is listed in Appendix I of CITES. According to the conservation group TRAFFIC, 2,170 casques were confiscated in just three years in China and Indonesia alone. There are fewer than 100 birds remaining in Thai forests. At least 546 hornbill parts, mostly casques of helmeted hornbills, have been posted for sale on Thai Facebook in the past five years. Traders will pay villagers 5,000-6,000 baht (US$165–200) for a hornbill head. Prices double or triple in cities and increase exponentially when sold overseas.

Ivory casque 

The casque is the source of hornbill ivory, a valuable carving material. Indigenous peoples also use the central tail feathers to decorate dancing cloaks and head-dresses.  Historically, the casque was also used by carvers in China and Japan.

References

Further reading
 
  Quoted at

External links 

 BirdLife Species Factsheet
 Photo from PaddleAsia
 Video Helmeted Hornbill National Geographic

helmeted hornbill
helmeted hornbill
Birds of Malesia
Birds of Thailand
Birds of Myanmar
helmeted hornbill